Bonifacio Adam Mena (born August 9, 1989) is an American soccer player who previously played for Charleston Battery in the USL Pro.

Career

College and Amateur
Mena spent his entire college career at the University of Notre Dame.  After going through the entire 2008 season without making an appearance, Mena made 16 appearances in 2009 and tallied one goal.  In 2010, Mena made 20 appearances and finished the year with two goals.  In 2011, he appeared in 18 matches and finished the year with three goals and five assists.  In 2012, Mena decided to return to Notre Dame for a fifth year, however his season was cut short after suffering a season-ending injury in the opener against Duke.

During his time at Notre Dame, Mena also played in the USL Premier Development League with West Michigan Edge, Kalamazoo Outrage and Indiana Invaders.

Professional
On January 22, 2013, Mena was drafted 10th overall in the 2013 MLS Supplemental Draft by Vancouver Whitecaps FC.  However, he did not sign with the club.  On March 21, 2014, it was announced that Mena had joined USL Pro club Charleston Battery for the 2014 season.  He made his professional the following day in a 1-1 draw with defending USL Pro champions Orlando City.

References

External links
Notre Dame Fighting Irish bio

1989 births
Living people
American soccer players
Association football midfielders
Charleston Battery players
Indiana Invaders players
Kalamazoo Outrage players
Notre Dame Fighting Irish men's soccer players
People from Holland, Michigan
Soccer players from Michigan
USL Championship players
USL League Two players
Vancouver Whitecaps FC draft picks
West Michigan Edge players